The Battle of Seneffe took place on 11 August 1674 near Seneffe in present-day Belgium during the 1672 to 1678 Franco-Dutch War. It was fought between a primarily French force commanded by Condé and a combined Dutch, Imperial, and Spanish force under William of Orange. One of only three battles in the Spanish Netherlands during the war, Seneffe was the most expensive in terms of casualties, although estimates vary considerably. 

By 1674, Allied forces in the Netherlands were numerically superior to the French army under Condé, which was based along the Piéton river near Charleroi. William took the offensive and sought to bring on a battle by outflanking the French positions but the broken ground forced him to divide his army into three separate columns. 

Condé took advantage of this to launch a cavalry attack against the Allied vanguard, and by midday on 11 August had halted their advance. Against the advice of his subordinates, he then ordered a series of frontal assaults which led to heavy casualties on both sides with no concrete result. Fighting continued until nightfall, when Condé withdrew to the Piéton and after holding his position overnight, William retired the next day in good order. 

Although both sides claimed victory, neither gained a clear advantage as a result; despite heavier casualties, William quickly rebuilt his army and by the end of August was relatively stronger than before Seneffe, while his own losses meant Louis XIV ordered Condé to focus thereafter on sieges. Of the two other battles in Flanders before the war ended in 1678, Cassel was sparked by an Allied attempt to relieve Saint-Omer and Saint-Denis was fought to prevent the French capture of Mons.

Background
Both France and the Dutch Republic viewed the Spanish Netherlands as essential for their security and trade, making it a contested area throughout the 17th century. France had occupied much of the region in the 1667-68 War of Devolution, before being forced by the Dutch-led Triple Alliance to return most of their gains in the 1668 Treaty of Aix-la-Chapelle. After this, Louis XIV decided the best way to force concessions from the Dutch was by defeating them first.

When the Franco-Dutch War began in May 1672, French troops quickly overran large parts of the Netherlands, but by July the Dutch position had stabilised. The unexpected success of his offensive had encouraged Louis to make excessive demands, while concern at French gains brought the Dutch support from Brandenburg-Prussia, Emperor Leopold, and Charles II of Spain. In August 1673, an Imperial army entered the Rhineland; facing war on multiple fronts, Louis withdrew most of his forces from the Netherlands, retaining only Grave and Maastricht.

In January 1674, Denmark joined the anti-French coalition, followed by the February Treaty of Westminster, which ended the Third Anglo-Dutch War. In May, the French took the offensive in the Spanish territory of Franche-Comté, while Condé remained on the defensive in the Spanish Netherlands. A combined Dutch-Spanish force under William of Orange and Count Monterrey, Governor of the Spanish Netherlands, spent June and July attempting to bring Condé to battle. When this proved unsuccessful, William proposed invading French Flanders, which would threaten Condé's rear and force him to fight; Monterrey agreed since it also provided an opportunity to recapture the key Spanish border town of Charleroi.

On 23 July, William was joined near Nivelles by an Imperial force under de Souches, a French Huguenot exile; along with 5,000 Spanish infantry and cavalry, this brought his numbers up to about 65,000. At the same time, the French completed their occupation of Franche-Comté which allowed Louis to send Condé substantial reinforcements, including his son the duc d'Enghien. By early August, Condé had 45,000 men entrenched along the line of the Piéton river which joined the Sambre at Charleroi.

Battle

Concluding these positions were too strong for a frontal assault, on 9 August the Allied army left Nivelles and established a line running from the villages of Arquennes to Roux, on the French left. By doing so, they hoped to tempt Condé into an attack, but he simply shifted his troops to face the threat; as a result, William proposed moving around Seneffe, and into the French rear. This was supported by the Spanish, since it would cut Condé's supply lines and isolate the French garrison in Charleroi (see Map). 

At 4:00 am on 11 August, the Allies set out in three columns, each marching parallel to the French positions, a formation dictated by the poor roads. The left column was commanded by de Souches, the right by the Marqués de Assentar, commander of the Spanish Army of Flanders, with the bulk of the infantry and artillery in the centre under William. A vanguard of 2,000 cavalry covered the gaps between the columns, with another 5,200 bringing up the rear led by Prince Vaudémont.

Hearing the Allies were on the move, at 5:30 am Condé rode out to observe their dispositions, and quickly perceived their intentions. The terrain they were crossing was marshy and broken up by numerous hedges, walls and woods, with limited exit points; gambling these factors would negate their superior numbers, Condé decided to attack. He sent 400 light cavalry under Saint Clar to skirmish with the Allied rearguard and slow down their march, while also despatching a cavalry brigade under the Marquis de Rannes to seize the high ground north of Seneffe.

Around 10:00 am, de Rannes came into contact with Vaudémont, who asked William for infantry support; he was sent three battalions under William Maurice of Nassau-Siegen, which he placed near the bridge over the Zenne or Senne river that flowed through Seneffe, with his cavalry just behind. Despite gout so severe he was unable to wear riding boots, Condé himself led the elite Maison du Roi cavalry across the Zenne above Seneffe, and scattered Vaudémont's cavalry, whose headlong flight temporarily disrupted the Spanish troops immediately behind them.  

Simultaneous assaults by de Rannes and the duc de Luxembourg eventually overwhelmed the Allied infantry in Seneffe, who were either killed or taken prisoner. By midday, Condé had inflicted significant losses on the Allies and gained a clear, if minor victory. He then persisted with a series of frontal assaults against the advice of his subordinates, and the battle degenerated into a number of confused and costly firefights.

William halted his march and established a defensive line, mainly composed of Dutch infantry, centred on the nearby Priory of St Nicolas; On the plain north of S. Nicolas, Assentar rallied his Spanish horsemen and the horsemen who had fled from Seneffe. In two engagagements the Allied cavalry was beaten back, but several French assaults on the priory were repulsed with heavy losses. However, after Assentar was mortally wounded in a third cavalry engagement, his men fell back, this time scattering their own infantry and allowing the French to capture the priory in a charge led by Condé himself. During this charge he was unhorsed and had to be rescued by his son.

However, the struggle around St Nicolas gave William, John Maurice of Nassau-Siegen and Hans Willem van Aylva time to complete a new defensive line at Fayt, composed of 23 Dutch battalions, while de Souches deployed his Imperial troops on their left. Condé, who mistakenly assumed the Allies were retreating towards Mons, now planned to roll up them up from behind. William however turned Fayt into a strong defensive position, placing cannons along the access roads and hedges. The ground in front of his position was unsuitable for the French cavalry, while the Allied cavalry were stationed behind their infantry, ready to repulse any French breakthrough. At the same time, the French lacked artillery support, since their heavy guns had been left behind during the advance.

Condé ordered his deputies, Luxembourg and Navailles, to assault the Allied flanks, while he himself stormed the village with the French and Swiss Guards. The attackers suffered heavy casualties but managed to capture six Dutch guns, before they were recaptured by a successful counterattack of Imperial cavalry and Dutch infantry. Around 21:00, Condé halted his assault, while Luxembourg had also been forced to break off his attack on the left flank; although Navailles gained ground on the right, the Dutch regrouped and he was unable to make further progress. 

However, de Souches had been given secret instructions from Vienna to minimise casualties and late in the afternoon ordered the Imperial troops to withdraw, which allowed Luxembourg to capture much of the Allied baggage train. Isolated firefights continued for another two hours, after which many soldiers fell asleep on the battlefield. Condé, intending to resume the battle the next day, had ordered his troops to remain on the battlefield, resting with weapons in hand amidst the dying and wounded. The Allies too had remained in their positions; and both armies now rested there, unmoving and silent, when suddenly, around midnight, a loud gunfire was heard and number of men were killed on both sides. A panic broke out in the French army, after which Condé ordered the retreat to Charleroi. William, only deterred from a pursuit by the objection of other commanders, most notably de Souches, ordered his troops to fire a triple salvo to claim victory and then withdrew to Mons.

Aftermath

Although both sides claimed victory on the basis of "holding their ground" at the end of the fighting, neither gained a clear advantage, although some historians argue the battle was a French victory or an Allied victory. The result could have been far more decisive had Condé taken advantage of his initial success, but his mistakes, combined with the courage and discipline of the Dutch and Spanish infantry, rescued William from a serious defeat. Despite capturing over 100 colours and standards, as well as most of the Allied baggage train, Condé failed to inflict a crushing defeat on the Allies. Since the battle failed to significantly change the overall strategic situation, other historians suggest it was essentially inconclusive.    

Casualties on both sides were enormous, with estimates of Allied losses ranging from 10,000  to 15,000, including prisoners.  The dead included Sir Walter Vane, deputy commander of the elite Scots Brigade, François Palm, Colonel of the Dutch Marines,  and Assentar, whose body was later returned by Condé for burial. French casualties were between 7,000 to 10,000 dead or wounded, with particularly heavy losses among the officer corps. These shocked the French court, one contemporary writing "We have lost so much by this victory that without the Te Deum and captured flags at Notre Dame, we would believe we had lost the battle". French military engineer and strategist Sébastien Le Prestre de Vauban argued Seneffe showed siege warfare was a better way to achieve victory than costly battles, and Louis ordered Condé to avoid a repeat. 

The Imperial troops escaped relatively untouched from the carnage at Seneffe, William claiming they had deliberately ignored his requests for support. Although Allied casualties were higher than those of the French, they were quickly replaced by taking troops from garrisons. In addition, a large convoy arrived in the Allied camp outside Mons on 31 August, bringing supplies, a month's pay in advance for the survivors and five new Dutch regiments. Combined with the losses suffered by Condé, the Allied army was now stronger relative to the French than before Seneffe, and William proposed another invasion attempt.

However, one less appreciated advantage held by the French over their opponents in this period was the benefit of undivided command and unified strategy. For different reasons, neither Monterrey or de Souches were willing to risk another battle and William was forced to compromise by besieging Oudenarde. Operations commenced on 16 September, and Condé began marching to its relief three days later. The Dutch and Spanish redoubled efforts to breach the walls before his arrival, but without advising his colleagues, de Souches sent the Imperial artillery off to Ghent. On 20 September, Condé took up position on the left bank of the Scheldt river and began bombarding the Allied positions on 21st. Since the Imperial troops would not fight without their guns, and the Dutch and Spanish could not face the French on their own, the Allies were forced to abandon the siege, along with most of their remaining equipment.

After strong protests from the Dutch States General, de Souches was relieved of his command, but this did little to solve the reality of diverging objectives. Emperor Leopold preferred to focus Imperial resources on the Upper Rhine, the Spanish wanted to recoup their losses in the Spanish Netherlands, while the Dutch prioritised the recapture of Grave and Maastricht. The Spanish returned to their garrisons, the Imperial troops recrossed the Meuse,  while William assumed command of operations at Grave, which had been besieged since 28 June and surrendered on 29 October. Condé received an elaborate state reception at Versailles for Seneffe, but his health was failing and the casualties diminished Louis' trust in his abilities. He temporarily assumed command of French troops in the Rhineland following Turenne's death at Salzbach in July 1675, but retired before the end of the year. In the longer term, Seneffe confirmed Louis' preference for positional warfare, ushering in a period where siege and manoeuvre dominated military tactics.

The Battle of Seneffe and Siege of Grave were illustrative of the stage the war had reached. Two years after the French lightning attack, the war had turned into a war of attrition. As armies expanded and the battlefield was relocated, casualties had increased. The Allies and France were of similar strength, but the parties were not yet tired enough of the war to agree to a peace.

Footnotes

References

Sources
 
 
 
 
 
 
 
 
 
 
 
 
 
 
 
 
 
 
 
 
 
 
 

Conflicts in 1674
1674 in the Habsburg Netherlands
Battles involving France
Battles involving the Dutch Republic
Battles involving the Holy Roman Empire
Battles involving the Spanish Netherlands
Battle
Franco-Dutch War
William III of England